The Silver Strand (An Trá Bhán in Irish) is a horse-shoe shaped beach situated at Malin Beg, near Glencolmcille, in south-west County Donegal, Ireland.

References

Gaeltacht places in County Donegal
Beaches of County Donegal